Coulomby is a commune in the Pas-de-Calais department in the Hauts-de-France region of France.

Geography
A small farming village situated 10 miles (16 km) west of Saint-Omer, at the D191 and D204 crossroads, just off the N42.

Population

Places of interest
 The church of St.Martin, dating from the sixteenth century.
 Ruins of a thirteenth-century chateau.

See also
Communes of the Pas-de-Calais department

References

External links

 Statistical data, INSEE

Communes of Pas-de-Calais